Statistics of Kyrgyzstan League for the 2003 season.

Overview
It was contested by 18 teams, and Zhashtyk Ak Altyn Kara-Suu won the championship.

First stage

Zone A

Zone B

League standings

References
Kyrgyzstan - List of final tables (RSSSF)

Kyrgyzstan League seasons
1
Kyrgyzstan
Kyrgyzstan